Adaina hodias is a moth of the family Pterophoridae. It is found in Brazil (Mato Grosso, São Paulo), Costa Rica, Venezuela (Mérida), Ecuador and Mexico.

The forewings are grey-white with ferruginous brown markings, consisting of a number of dots. The fringes are grey-white and the underside is grey-brown. The hindwings are grey-white and the fringes are grey. The underside is pale grey-brown.

Adults are on wing in February, April, July, August, October and December.

References

Moths described in 1908
Oidaematophorini